Gaston Méry (20 April 1866 – 15 July 1909) was a French author, translator and journalist. He was violently antisemitic and was also hostile to the people of the south of France, whom he saw as racially impure and inferior Latin peoples compared to the Celts of the north. He founded a journal L'écho du merveilleux which was largely devoted to proving the reality of a series of visions of the Virgin Mary, Joan of Arc and Jesus reported by Marie Martel in Calvados. From 1900 until his death he was a member of the Paris municipal council.

Life

Gaston Méry was born in  Sens on 20 April 1866, son of a merchant.
He completed his classical studies in Sens.
After his military service he began to study law, but abandoned this when his parents were financially ruined.
He moved to Paris and found work as a maitre répétiteur (teaching assistant) at the École Monge, where he spent three years.
In 1889 he published  L'école où l'on s'amuse, in which he criticized the English system of education.
While teaching he took courses at the Faculty of Law, and was licensed in 1889.
The next year he was appointed copywriter at the Public Assistance, where he worked until 20 April 1891 when he resigned to become editor of the Libre Parole.

Journalism

Gaston Méry joined the daily newspaper La Libre Parole shortly after it was launched by Édouard Drumont.
He was soon made editor in chief due to his skill in exploiting scandalous affairs and his daring invective.
Méry remained with the Libre Parole until his death in 1909.
The newspaper, with its motto "France for the French", was aggressively antisemitic.
Méry's violent polemics often resulted in duels and lawsuits.
In 1895 he was tried at the Assize Court for having accused Mr. Paul Strauss, Paris city councilor, of having sold his vote.
He was acquitted by the Jury of the Seine.
His fought well-publicized duels with Émile Gustave Laffon, Governor of New Caledonia, Dr. Ward, physician of the Mizon mission, M. Rogier, Adolphe Possien and the Prince de la Moskowa.
He defended Jean-Baptiste Bidegain(fr) in La Libre Parole when Bidegain was attacked by the media during the Affaire des fiches (1904–05).

Marguerite Durand's newspaper La Fronde refused to donate money to a fund sponsored by La Libre Parole for the widow of Colonel Hubert-Joseph Henry, who had forged the papers used in the trial of Alfred Dreyfus.
La Libre Parole then made a series of attacks on Durand's character, accusing her of being a bad mother and a prostitute.
Méry claimed she had turned away an old friend from her days as an actress, implying that she wanted to forget this aspect of her past.
Durand sued the paper in December 1898.
When Bradamante wrote in La Fronde that subscribing to the Henry fund would be to pay homage to a criminal, Méry countered that the frondeuses would not "'come to the aid of a mother in tears with her baby."
He wrote that La Fronde was being funded by the same Jewish association that was paying to overturn the Dreyfus trial decision and to destroy the French nation.

Méry was initiated into the Martinist Order in the third degree by "Papus" (Gérard Encausse) on December 18, 1894.
In 1897 he founded the review L'écho du merveilleux.
This journal, published between 1897 and 1909, met the demand for rational discussion of the occult.
It rapidly gained a large circulation.
It devoted many of its issues to proving the veracity of the visions of the child Marie Martel at Tilly-sur-Seulles.
It alleged that the words of the Virgin were identical to those pronounced at Lourdes.
Méry tried to make a portrait of the Holy Family from the words of the little seer, and tried to create the plans of the basilica from her words.
Méry wrote several pamphlets on Mysticism and Occultism, of which Apparitions de Tilly: la Voyante de la rue de Paradis sold 224,000 copies.

Racism

Gaston Méry told the Comité Nationale Antijuif that, just as Cato the Elder had always said "Carthage must be destroyed", "I end by telling you, we must destroy the Jews."
Méry published his novel Jean Révolte at Dentu in 1892, with a main character modelled on Drumont.
In this novel he expounded a new and very personal theory he called le Racisme.
The difference is that while Dumont hated Jews, Révolte hated southerners, and felt that only in the north was the Gallic blood pure.
Behind the southerner, Jean Révolte immediately discovers the Jew: "If under the Greek we discover the Aryan, by scratching the Latin we find the Semite".
In his racial theory, although the French nobility was German and the bourgeoisie was Latin, the common people of northern France were purely Celtic.
Mery wrote:

Politics

Gaston Méry was a municipal councilor in Paris from 1900 to 1909.
During the May 1900 municipal elections the Nationalists won 50 of the 80 seats on the Paris Municipal Council.
Méry was one of the 24 Nationalists who had no other political allegiance.
Mery was supported by Drumont's Ligue antisémitique de France and also by the Patrie Française and Ligue des Patriotes, but not by Rochéfort's Parti Républicain Socialiste Français.
Méry was elected in the first round on 6 May 1900 for the Faubourg Montmartre constituency as city councillor and general councillor of the Seine.

The victorious Nationalists ordered the removal of Urbain Gohier's books from the city libraries, which they considered to be unpatriotic insults to the army, to be replaced with Méry's Loubet la Honte (Loubet the Disgrace).
Loubet-la-Honte (1900) was a violent attack on Émile Loubet, President of France, and caused a considerable stir.
Méry wanted to base his political action on direct contact with the divine word, particularly during the Dreyfus affair.
He joined the Republican-nationalist-anti-Semitic group, and was made a member of the Committee of Public Assistance.

During the 1904 municipal elections Méry spoke in Paris to a meeting of 5,000 nationalist members of the Ligue des Patriotes and the Patrie française.
He praised Drumont, François Coppée and Victor Henri Rochefort, none of whom had been invited to the meeting, and urged the attendees to support Drumont's PLA.
However, Gabriel Syveton called on the audience to have nothing to do with Drumont or anyone, such as Méry, connected to La Libre Parole.
In his view antisemitism was damaging to the Patrie Française, and the party's candidates in the council elections should avoid the subject.
The slogan "Down with the Jews" should not be used at the election rallies.

Gaston Méry died in Paris on 15 July 1909.

Publications
Publications by Gaston Méry include:

Notes

Sources

 

 

1866 births
1909 deaths
People from Sens
French journalists